{{DISPLAYTITLE:C3H9O3P}}
The molecular formula C3H9O3P (molar mass: 124.076 g/mol, exact mass: 124.0289 u) may refer to:

 Dimethyl methylphosphonate
 Trimethyl phosphite

Molecular formulas